The broad mite, Polyphagotarsonemus latus (Acari: Tarsonemidae), is a microscopic species of mite found on many species of plants, including important agricultural species such as grapes, apples, and other fruits. Broad mites are also currently affecting cannabis plants, as the industry matures with legalization. The mites are found in many areas throughout the world and are major pests in greenhouses.

A P. latus infestation can cause stunting and twisting of the leaves and flowers, and blackening and death of new growth. The damage resembles that caused by herbicides. The mites prefer areas of high humidity and low temperature. They can be controlled by removing and destroying infested plants, and spraying with an acaricide. Alternatively, broad mite infestations can be controlled through the introduction of predatory mites, such as Typhlodromips swirskii, Neoseiulus californicus, or Neoseiulus cucumeris.

References

External links
UC IPM online

Trombidiformes
Agricultural pest mites
Animals described in 1904
Arachnids of South America